The Tax Reduction and Simplification Act of 1977 was passed by the 95th United States Congress and signed into law by President Jimmy Carter on May 23, 1977.

It replaced the percentage standard deduction and minimum standard deduction with a single standard deduction of $3,200 (joint returns) and temporarily extended the general tax credit (maximum of $35/capita or 2% of $9,000 income) through 1978.

See also
Congressional Budget and Impoundment Control Act of 1974

References

External links
 

United States federal taxation legislation
1977 in law